Ungoofaaru (Dhivehi: އުނގޫފާރު) is the capital of Northern Maalhosmadulhu Atoll.

Geography

It is located on the Eastern rim of the atoll.

Demography
Following the 2004 tsunami, the residents of the devastated Kandholhudhoo island were moved into temporary accommodation on Ungoofaaru, before being rehoused on nearby Dhvuvaafaaru in 2008.

Health
The island is the location for Ungoofaaru Regional Hospital, the largest hospital in the Northern Province.

References

Populated places in the Maldives
Islands of the Maldives